The H700 Shenzhen Tower is a vision megatall skyscraper in Shenzhen, Guangdong, China. The tower is designed by Chicago-based company bKL Architecture.

See also
Bionic Tower
Wuhan Greenland Center
Qianhai Tower
Wuhan CTF Centre
Shanghai Tower
Shanghai World Financial Center
KK100
Ping An Finance Centre

References

Proposed buildings and structures in China
Buildings and structures in Shenzhen